George Alden may refer to:
 George I. Alden (1843–1926), American mechanical engineer and academic innovator
 George J. Alden ( 1860), Florida state senator